The African Episcopal Church of St. Thomas (AECST) was founded in 1792 in Philadelphia, Pennsylvania, as the first black Episcopal Church in the United States. Its congregation developed from the Free African Society, a non-denominational group formed by blacks who had left St. George's Methodist Church because of discrimination and segregation by class. They were led by Absalom Jones, a free black and lay Methodist preacher. As his congregation became established, he was ordained in 1802 by Presiding Bishop William White as the first black priest in the Episcopal Church. Bishop White also ordained William Levington as a deacon at this church, although he soon became a missionary in the South, establishing St. James Church in Baltimore in 1824.

The congregation remains within the Episcopal Diocese of Pennsylvania—although, as discussed below, its location changed several times. St. Thomas became a leading institution in Philadelphia's black cultural life.

Its second rector was William Douglass, an African American, former student of Rev. Levington, and an abolitionist. Clergy and parishioners were active in the Underground Railroad in the 19th century, and participated in the modern Civil Rights Movement in the mid to late 20th century.

St. Thomas was the first black church in the country to purchase a pipe organ, and the first to hire a black woman as organist, who was Ann Appo. Other notable organists were John C. Bowers and his brother, Thomas J. Bowers.

Location 
While the congregation has worshipped in several different buildings, it has remained continuously active since its founding. The site of the original building, dedicated on July 17, 1794, at Fifth and Adelphi streets, is now covered by the passageway/plaza known as St. James Place.  It also worshipped for a time on Twelfth Street south of Walnut Street, before following changing demographics and moving out of the downtown area to West Philadelphia, where the congregation worshipped at 57th and Pearl streets, and 52nd and Parrish streets. It then moved  to Philadelphia's Overbrook Farms neighborhood, where it currently worships at a church at the intersection of Overbrook and Lancaster avenues

See also
 History of the African-Americans in Philadelphia

References

External links 

 Official website
 African Episcopal Church of St. Thomas records from the Archives of the African Episcopal Church of St. Thomas

African-American churches
African-American history in Philadelphia
Churches in Philadelphia
Religious organizations established in 1792
1792 establishments in Pennsylvania